Stronger Than Ever is the fourth studio album by German heavy metal band Grave Digger. However, they changed their name to just "Digger" for this release. Retrospect Records, a little-known record label, very briefly issued a re-release of the album on CD in 2005.  The CD was released with presumably no involvement from the band and is considered a bootleg. The CD is no longer available and the only official versions of the album that were released by the band are the vinyl and cassette versions. To this day it remains the only album in Grave Digger's catalog to not receive an official CD release. "Shadows of the Past" borrows two lyrical lines from "Yesterday", a song released on their 1984 album Heavy Metal Breakdown.

Track listing

Notes
 The 1987 cassette release contains an exclusive untitled intro before "Shadows of the Past", which is not listed
 The track listing is erroneously printed on the back cover as:
 Stand Up and Rock
 Wanna Get Close
 Lay It On
 Don't Leave Me Lonely
 Stronger than Ever
 I Don't Need Your Love
 Moonriders
 Stay till the Morning
 Listen to the Music
 Shadows of the Past

Personnel 
 Chris Boltendahl – vocals
 Uwe Lulis – guitars
 C. F. Brank – bass
 Albert Eckardt – drums

Additional musicians
 Bodo Schopf – drum programming
 Matthias "Matz" Ulmer – keyboards
 Armin Sabol – lead guitars on "Stand Up and Rock"

Production
 Karl-U. Walterbach – executive producer
 Mick Jackson – producer
 Steven Begg – cover art, photography
 Jan Němec – engineering, mixing, mastering

References

1986 albums
Grave Digger (band) albums
Noise Records albums